Rechka Mishikha is a rural locality (a settlement) in Kabansky District, Republic of Buryatia, Russia. The population was 18 as of 2010. There are 3 streets.

Geography 
Rechka Mishikha is located 97 km southwest of Kabansk (the district's administrative centre) by road. Klyuyevka is the nearest rural locality.

References 

Rural localities in Kabansky District
Populated places on Lake Baikal